The 1998 Budweiser 500K was a CART race that took place at the Twin Ring Motegi in Motegi, Japan on March 28, 1998. It was the 2nd round of the 1998 CART season.

Race results

References

Budweiser 500k, 1998
Budweiser 500K, 1998